The Colosseum Tournament (COLOSSEUM) is a kickboxing, mixed martial arts (MMA) and boxing promotion company based in Romania, which is owned by Gabriel Georgescu. It is one of the largest kickboxing promotions in the country, and takes its name from colosseum.   

It promoted the first sanctioned professional event in Ploiești, Romania on November 26, 2016, and since its inception can be seen on Digi Sport and on FightBox in over 60 countries. 

On April 15, 2021, it was announced that Colosseum Tournament and Netherlands-based Glorious Fight Events entered a partnership. The deal encompasses commitment to promote their fighters. Colosseum Tournament also has a partnership with Prometheus Fighting Promotion.

It has featured fighters such as Daniel Ghiță, Andrei Stoica, Bogdan Stoica, Sebastian Cozmâncă, Eduard Gafencu, Florin Lambagiu, Amansio Paraschiv, Sorin Căliniuc, Gabriel Bozan, Cristian Spetcu, Cristiana Stancu, and Alexandru Lungu, among others.

Events
Each event contains several fights. Traditionally, every event starts off with an opening fight followed by other fights, with the last fight being known as the main event.

Prometheus Fighting Promotion
Prometheus FP is a brand of the Colosseum Tournament that was introduced on July 22, 2021. The brand serves as a developmental territory, featuring rookies from Romania competing to become members of Colosseum Tournament's roster. FightBox and Digi Sport are the main broadcasters of Prometheus FP.

See also
 Colosseum Tournament in 2021
 Dynamite Fighting Show
 Golden Fighter Championship
 KO Masters
 OSS Fighters

Notes

References

External links
   
Colosseum Tournament on Facebook 
Colosseum Tournament's channel on YouTube
FightBox HD   

 
 

2016 establishments in Romania
Kickboxing organizations 
Mixed martial arts organizations 
Professional boxing organizations
Sports organizations established in 2016 
Companies based in Ploiești